The International Harvester Building is a five-story building in the U.S. city of Peoria, Illinois. The property consists of the 1914 five-story building and a 1925 one-story addition. The building is associated with Peoria's history through transportation; Peoria was once a major shipping point due to its vicinity to the Illinois River and major railroad connections. The structure was added to the National Register of Historic Places on November 15, 2005, after the National Register's 50 year cut off for inclusion had expired on the building's original period of significance (1914-1955).

Notes

Buildings and structures in Peoria, Illinois
National Register of Historic Places in Peoria County, Illinois
Commercial buildings on the National Register of Historic Places in Illinois